Ayotomiwa Sherif Dele-Bashiru (born 17 September 1999) is a professional footballer who plays as an attacking midfielder for EFL Championship club Watford. Born in England, Dele-Bashiru represents Nigeria internationally.

Career
Dele-Bashiru made his professional debut on 19 December 2017 in the EFL Cup against Leicester City, replacing Phil Foden in the 91st minute and playing in extra time.

On 24 July 2019, Dele-Bashiru joined Watford on a six-year deal after his contract with Manchester City expired. He made his Watford debut and scored the opening goal in a 3–3 draw against Tranmere Rovers in the FA Cup third round.

On his first league start, Dele-Bashiru came off injured in the first-half against Reading on 3 October 2020. It was confirmed that he would undergo surgery for an anterior cruciate ligament injury and would be out for around six months.

After returning to training and representing the Hornets during the pre-season in Summer 2021, Dele-Bashiru joined Reading on a season-long loan, in order to get more playing time and fully restore his fitness. He scored his first goals for Reading when he scored twice against Peterborough United on 14 September 2021 in a 3-1 win.

International career
Dele-Bashiru has represented the England under-16 team, but he is also eligible for Nigeria. He was part of the Nigeria national under-20 football team in the 2019 FIFA U-20 World Cup in Poland. Dele-Bashiru scored Nigeria's third goal in their opening match win against Qatar, with the game finishing 4–0.

Personal life
Dele-Bashiru's younger brother Fisayo also came through the ranks at Manchester City before joining Sheffield Wednesday.

Career statistics

References

External links

England profile at The Football Association

1999 births
Living people
Footballers from Manchester
Citizens of Nigeria through descent
Nigerian footballers
Nigeria under-20 international footballers
English footballers
England youth international footballers
English sportspeople of Nigerian descent
Manchester City F.C. players
Watford F.C. players
Reading F.C. players
Association football midfielders
English Football League players